The Starr Bumble Bee II was an experimental aircraft designed and built specifically to acquire the title of “The World’s Smallest Airplane”.

Design and development

The Bumble Bee II was designed, and built by Robert H. Starr in Phoenix, Arizona  with the intent of breaking the record for world's smallest biplane. Robert Starr had been deeply involved with the development of aircraft holding previous “smallest airplane” titles, including his own Bumble Bee I, which temporarily lost the record of world's smallest aircraft to the Baby Bird designed by Donald Stits, that is until Bumble Bee II flew and regained the Guinness record. The design of the Bumble Bee II is similar to Starr's original Bumble Bee I except the Bumble Bee II was smaller and lighter Both aircraft were biplanes. Both aircraft had negative staggered, cantilevered wings and conventional (tail dragger) landing gears.  The fuselage of the Bumble Bee II was constructed of welded steel tubing with sheet metal covering, while the wings were covered in aircraft plywood. The power plant was a Continental C85 4 – cylinder air-cooled horizontally opposed cylinder engine (Boxer Motor) that produced 85 hp. The upper wings had flaps and the lower wings had ailerons. All wing airframe structures were equipped with tip plates to enhance the lift coefficient. The airplane had a small cockpit with the rudder pedals located under the engine compartment toward the front of the cowling.

Operational history

The Bumble Bee II was flown on April 2, 1988, at Marana Airport just outside of Tucson, Arizona to achieve the world record for the smallest piloted airplane. According to the Guinness Book of World Records, the Bumble Bee II crashed and was destroyed during the 3rd flight on the 5th of May, 1988. At 400 feet of altitude, the engine failed on a down-wind leg. The crash destroyed the Bumble Bee II and severely injured Robert Starr, who made a full recovery.

Aircraft on public display

The Bumble Bee I is on public display at the Pima Air & Space Museum.

Naming
Starr named the aircraft after the bumble bee because bumble bees allegedly do not have enough wing area to fly according to standard aerodynamics, and engineers and pilots made a similar statement about Starr's Bumble Bee I and II, yet both flew.

Specifications

References

External links 

 Flight test video

1980s United States sport aircraft
Biplanes with negative stagger
Single-engined tractor aircraft
Aircraft first flown in 1988
Conventional landing gear